Robert Patterson (May 20, 1743 – July 22, 1824) was an American educator and director of the United States Mint. He was born on a lease-held farm near Hillsborough, County Down, Ireland, emigrated to the North American British colonies in 1768, and lived for a time in Philadelphia.

In 1774, he became principal of an academy in Wilmington, Delaware. A Patriot in the American Revolution, after the battles of Lexington and Concord he began instructing his students in military matters and served as adjutant in a local company of the Delaware militia. When classes were suspended because of the War of Independence, he returned to Greenwich Township, Cumberland County, New Jersey, where he had earlier lived, and hastily received enough training to serve as an assistant surgeon in a New Jersey militia company. Militia service was not a full-time activity, but he frequently served in the field for nearly three years, and was appointed a brigade major.

From 1779 to 1814, he was professor of mathematics in the University of Pennsylvania, being also serving as vice provost from 1810 to 1813.  In 1805, without solicitation, President Jefferson appointed him director of the mint, which position he held until a short time before his death.  Always actively interested in the American Philosophical Society, he was elected a member in 1783 and served as its president from 1819 until his death.  He published The Newtonian System (1808) and edited various works on mathematics and physics. His son, Robert M. Patterson, followed in his footsteps, also becoming director of the mint and teaching at the University of Pennsylvania.

In 1803, after Jefferson's urging, Patterson taught Meriwether Lewis the refinements of computing latitude and longitude for the upcoming Lewis and Clark Expedition.

References

Entry from the New International Encyclopedia.
Du Bois, William Ewing. A Record of the Families of Robert Patterson.... 1847. Accessed via Google Book Search.

External links

1743 births
1824 deaths
Burials at Laurel Hill Cemetery (Philadelphia)
People from Hillsborough, County Down
Directors of the United States Mint
Kingdom of Ireland emigrants to the Thirteen Colonies
New Jersey militiamen in the American Revolution
Educators from Philadelphia
University of Pennsylvania faculty
Members of the American Philosophical Society
People of colonial Pennsylvania
People from Greenwich Township, Cumberland County, New Jersey
Jefferson administration personnel
Madison administration personnel
Monroe administration personnel